The cinnamon-tailed sparrow (Peucaea sumichrasti) is a species of bird in the family Passerellidae that is endemic to Mexico. Its natural habitats are subtropical or tropical dry forest and subtropical or tropical dry shrubland. It is threatened by habitat loss.

References

cinnamon-tailed sparrow
Endemic birds of Mexico
Birds of Mexico
Near threatened fauna of North America
cinnamon-tailed sparrow
Taxonomy articles created by Polbot